Eighth Kilometer District Stadium, is a soccer-specific stadium located in Nizami raion, Baku, Azerbaijan. It was opened in 2012 and has a capacity of 11,000 spectators. In 2013 it was renamed to Bakcell Arena. Bakcell Arena is serving as the home ground of the Azerbaijan Premier League club Neftchi PFK.

The stadium hosted some of the 2012 FIFA U-17 Women's World Cup matches.

References

See also
List of football stadiums in Azerbaijan

Football venues in Baku
Sports venues completed in 2012